The following lists events that happened in 2012 in Iceland.

Incumbents
President – Ólafur Ragnar Grímsson 
Prime Minister – Jóhanna Sigurðardóttir

Politics

30 June:  2012 Icelandic presidential election, Ólafur Ragnar Grímsson won a recond fifth-term as President of Iceland

 
2010s in Iceland
Iceland
Iceland
Years of the 21st century in Iceland